The Great Crossover Potential is a greatest hits album by the Sugarcubes, released on July 14, 1998.  It contains tracks from the group's three studio albums, with no new tracks or remixes.

Track listing

Notes
 Tracks 1–5 are from the Sugarcubes' debut album, Life's Too Good.
 Tracks 6–9 are from their second album, Here Today, Tomorrow Next Week!
 Tracks 10–14 are from their final album, Stick Around for Joy

References

1988 greatest hits albums
The Sugarcubes albums
Elektra Records compilation albums
One Little Independent Records compilation albums